Agasha may refer to:
Agasha Temple of Wisdom, a US spiritualist group
Juliet Bashiisha Agasha, a Ugandan politician
Agasha, a diminutive of the Russian male first name Agafon
Agasha, a diminutive of the Russian female first name Agafonika
Agasha, a diminutive of the Russian male first name Agap
Agasha, a diminutive of the Russian female first name Agapiya
Agasha, a diminutive of the Russian male first name Agav
Agasha, a diminutive of the Russian male first name Agavva